The McKelligon Canyon Formation is a geologic formation in Texas. It preserves fossils dating back to the Ordovician period.

See also

 List of fossiliferous stratigraphic units in Texas
 Paleontology in Texas

References
 

Ordovician geology of Texas
Ordovician southern paleotropical deposits